Astathes pseudopartita is a species of beetle in the family Cerambycidae. It was described by Breuning in 1956.

Subspecies
 Astathes pseudopartita bankaensis Breuning, 1956
 Astathes pseudopartita pseudopartita Breuning, 1956

References

P
Beetles described in 1956